Franco Cavegn (born 6 January 1971) is a Swiss former alpine skier who competed in the 1994, 1998, and 2002 Winter Olympics.

External links
 

1971 births
Living people
Swiss male alpine skiers
Olympic alpine skiers of Switzerland
Alpine skiers at the 1994 Winter Olympics
Alpine skiers at the 1998 Winter Olympics
Alpine skiers at the 2002 Winter Olympics